Ritson is an English surname. Notable people with the surname include:

Adam Ritson (born 1976), Australian rugby league player
Alex Ritson (1922–2008), Canadian ice hockey player
Blake Ritson (born 1980), English actor and director
Bradley Ritson (born 1982), South African footballer
John Ritson (born 1949), English footballer
John Anthony Sydney Ritson (1887–1957), English professor of mining and international rugby union player
Joseph Ritson (1752–1803), English antiquary
Joshua Ritson (1874–1955), British Labour Party politician
Ledger Ritson (1921–1977), English footballer
Ralph Gerald Ritson (1885–1966), English polo player

See also
Ritson Manuscript, English choirbook
Ritsons Force, waterfalls in the Lake District, England

English-language surnames